Bryon H. Short (born March 7, 1966) is an American politician. He was a Democratic member of the Delaware House of Representatives from 2006 to 2018. Short earned a BA in psychology from Salisbury University.

Electoral history
2007 When Republican Representative Wayne Smith resigned and left the District 7 seat open, Short won the April 2007 Special election.
2008 Short won the September 9, 2008 Democratic Primary and won the November 4, 2008 General election with 6,281 votes (58.6%) against Republican nominee James Bowers.
2010 Short was unopposed for the September 17, 2010 Democratic Primary and won the three-way November 2, 2010 General election with 4,983 votes (56.9%) against Republican nominee Judith Travis and Scott Gesty (who had qualified and received votes as both the Independent Party of Delaware and Libertarian candidate).
2012 Short was unopposed for the September 11, 2012 Democratic Primary and won the three-way November 6, 2012 General election with 7,280 votes (68.2%) against Republican nominee Daniel Lepre and Libertarian candidate C. Robert Wilson.

References

External links
Official page at the Delaware General Assembly
Campaign site
 

Place of birth missing (living people)
1966 births
Living people
Democratic Party members of the Delaware House of Representatives
People from New Castle County, Delaware
Salisbury University alumni
21st-century American politicians